This is a list of the National Register of Historic Places listings in Gratiot County, Michigan.

This is intended to be a complete list of the properties and districts on the National Register of Historic Places in Gratiot County, Michigan, United States. Latitude and longitude coordinates are provided for many National Register properties and districts; these locations may be seen together in a map.

There are 10 properties and districts listed on the National Register in the county.

Current listings

|}

See also

 List of National Historic Landmarks in Michigan
 National Register of Historic Places listings in Michigan
 Listings in neighboring counties: Clinton, Ionia, Isabella, Midland, Montcalm, Saginaw, Shiawassee

References

Gratiot